Klimov is a Russian male surname, its feminine counterpart is Klimova. It may refer to

Alexandra Klimova (1921–?), Russian/Soviet actress and People's Artist of the USSR
Alexei Klimov (born 1975), Russian sport shooter
Andrey Klimov (born 1982), Russian boxer
Dmitri Klimov (born 1983), Russian footballer
 Ekaterina Klimova (born 1971), Russian Art critic, Art historian and Curator.
Ekaterina Klimova (born 1978), Russian film, theater and TV actress
Elem Klimov (1933–2003), Soviet film director
Fedor Klimov (born 1990), Russian pair skater
Galina Klimova (born 1942), Russian rower
Georgy Klimov (1928–1997), Russian linguist
Gregory Klimov (1918-2007), pen-name of Igor Kalmykov a.k.a. Ralph Werner, Soviet defector and writer
Igor Klimov (born 1989), Russian football defender
Ivan Klimov (1903–1991), Soviet military leader
Leonid Klimov (born 1953), Ukrainian politician and banker
Marina Klimova (born 1966), Russian ice dancer
Marusya Klimova (born 1962), Russian writer
Mikhail Klimov (actor) (1880–1942), Russian/Soviet actor and People's Artist of the USSR
Mikhail Klimov (choirmaster) (1881–1937), Russian choirmaster and leader of the St. Petersburg Capella in the early 20th century
Natalya Klimova (born 1951), Ukrainian former basketball player
Nikolai Klimov (1904–1991), Soviet army officer and Hero of the Soviet Union
Oksana Klimova (born 1992), Russian ice dancer
Pavel Klimov (1920–1992), Soviet aircraft pilot and Hero of the Soviet Union
Rita Klímová (1931–1993), Czech economist and politician
Sergey Klimov (canoeist) (born 1935), Soviet sprint canoer
Sergey Alexandrovich Klimov (born 1980), Russian racing cyclist
Valery Klimov (violinist) (born 1931), Peoples Artist of the USSR
Valeri Klimov (footballer) (born 1974), Russian footballer
Valeri Klimov (ice hockey) (born 1986), Russian ice hockey player
Vladimir Klimov, Soviet sprint canoer
Vladimir Klimov (designer) (1892–1962), Soviet aircraft engine designer and academician
Vladimir Klimov (soldier) (1922–1980), Soviet soldier and Hero of the Soviet Union
Yevgeni Klimov (born 1985), Kazakhstani professional football player
Yuri Klimov (born 1961) (1961–2000), MVD officer and Hero of Russia
Yury Klimov (1940–2022), Soviet/Russian handball player and Olympic team gold medalist

Russian-language surnames